Baird Textile Holdings Ltd v Marks & Spencer plc [2001] EWCA Civ 274 is an English contract law case on the possibility of an implied contract after a course of dealings between two businesses.

Facts 
Baird Textile Holdings Ltd had supplied clothes to Marks & Spencer plc. for thirty years. All of a sudden, M&S said they were cancelling their order. Baird sued M&S on the grounds that they should have been given reasonable notice. The problem was, there was no express contract under which such a term could be said to have arisen. Baird argued that a contract should be implied through their course of dealings. The judge found there was no such contract, and Baird appealed to the Court of Appeal.

Judgment
Sir Andrew Morritt V-C (with whom Judge LJ and Mance LJ concurred), found that a contract could not be implied. Contracts are only implied where it is necessary. Here, any such agreement to keep up the purchase of clothes, subject to reasonable notice for termination, would be too uncertain. Uncertainty was confirmed by an absence of intention to be legally bound. Furthermore, an argument of estoppel could not succeed because estoppel is not capable (in English law as yet) of creating its own cause of action. Also, concerning estoppel, Judge LJ held that  “The interesting question…is whether equity can provide a remedy which cannot be provided by contract. It seems clear that the principles of the law of estoppel have not yet been fully developed…”  questioning estoppel and the applicability of equity.

Richard Field QC, Charles Bear and Herbert Smith acted for Baird and Michael Brindle QC, Andrew Burrows and Freshfields Bruckhaus Deringer acted for M&S.

See also 
 The Aramis [1989] 1 Lloyd’s Rep 213, Bingham LJ

References

External links
 Text of the Baird Textile Holdings Ltd v. Marks & Spencer plc. judgment from www.ucc.ie

English enforceability case law
Court of Appeal (England and Wales) cases
2001 in case law
2001 in British law
Textile industry of the United Kingdom